Campsiandra is a genus of flowering plants in the family Fabaceae. It belongs to the subfamily Caesalpinioideae.

References

External links 

Caesalpinioideae
Fabaceae genera